Gunupur is a Vidhan Sabha constituency of Rayagada district, Odisha.

This constituency includes Gunupur, Gudari, Gunupur block, Ramanaguda block, Padmapur block, Chandrapur block and Gudari block.

Members of the Legislative Assembly

Fifteen elections were held between 1951 and 2009 including one By election in 1955.
Elected members from the Gunupur constituency are:
2014: (138): Trinath Gomango (BJD)
2009: (138): Ramamurty Mutika (BJD)
2004: (80): Hemabati Gamang (Congress)
2000: (80): Ramurty Gamango (BJP)
(By poll) Bhagirathi Gamang (Indp)
1995: (80): Akshya Kumar Gomango (Congress)
1990: (80): Ramamurty Gomango (Janata Dal)
1985: (80): Bhagirathi Gamang (Congress)
1980: (80): Bhagirathi Gamang (Congress-I)
1977: (80): Bhagirathi Gamang (Congress)
1974: (80): Bhagirathi Gamang (Congress)
1971: (76): Bhagirathi Gamang (Jana Congress)
1967: (76): Bhagirathi Gamang (Congress)
1961: (11): Narasimha Patro (Congress)
1957: (9): Narasingha Patra (Congress) and Sanyasi Charan Pidika (Congress)
1955: (By Poll): Bhagirathi Gamang (Ganatantra Parishad)
1951: (8): Sabar Dumba (Ganatantra Parishad)

Election Results

2019

2014
In 2014 election, Biju Janata Dal candidate Trinath Gomango defeated Indian National Congress candidate Purusattam Gomango by a margin of 8,286 votes.

2009 
In 2009 election, Biju Janata Dal candidate Ramamurty Mutika defeated Indian National Congress candidate Sisir Kumar Gamang by a margin of 18,749 votes.

Notes

References

Assembly constituencies of Odisha
Rayagada district